Batoteuthis skolops, the bush-club squid, is the single rare species in genus Batoteuthis, which is the only genus in family Batoteuthidae. The squid is found in Antarctic waters, and reaches a mantle length of at least 350 mm. Some features of this creature are a small head, a long tail and a very peculiar tentacle with six series of suckers on the club.

The genus contains bioluminescent species.

Distribution
B. skolops occurs in the Southern Ocean. Its range may be circumpolar with a strict Antarctic distribution and it may live in bathypelagic depths.

Ecology
This squid is eaten by several predators in the Southern Ocean, like albatrosses and sperm whales.

Their diet is unknown, but 15N ratios showed high values in their tissues which point towards either a high trophic level, or living in great depths (or both).

References

External links

 Tree of Life web project: Batoteuthis skolops

Squid
Molluscs described in 1968
Monotypic mollusc genera
Cephalopod genera
Bioluminescent molluscs